The Tremplin Olympique du Mont was a ski jumping venue constructed for the 1924 Winter Olympics in Chamonix, France.

Jump description
The jumper started at a height of 1189.8 m, traveling 79.4 meters while dropping in height to a take off point of 1152.8 meters. Upon flight, the K-point was determined to be 71.5 meters.

1924 Winter Olympics
This venue hosted both the ski jumping and the ski jumping part of the Nordic combined events at the 1924 Winter Olympics.

After the Olympics
The hill served as a venue for the FIS Nordic World Ski Championships 1937. Built in 1905, it was renovated in 1998.

References
1924 Olympics official report. pp. 650–2. 

Venues of the 1924 Winter Olympics
Ski jumping venues in France
Olympic Nordic combined venues
Olympic ski jumping venues
Sports venues in Haute-Savoie